William Elphinstone (143125 October 1514) was a Scottish statesman, Bishop of Aberdeen and founder of the University of Aberdeen.

Biography
He was born in Glasgow. His father, also William Elphinstone, later became the first Dean of the Faculty of Arts at the University of Glasgow.  It has been suggested that his mother may have been Margaret Douglas, daughter of Sir William Douglas, the first laird of Drumlanrig. William Elphinstone junior was educated at the High School of Glasgow and then the University of Glasgow, taking the degree of M.A. in 1452. After practising for a short time as a lawyer in the church courts, he was ordained a priest, becoming rector of St. Michael's Church, Trongate, Glasgow, in 1465. Four years later he went to continue his studies at the University of Paris, where he became reader in Canon law, and then, proceeding to Orléans, became lecturer in the university there.

Before 1474 he had returned to Scotland, and was made academic rector of the university, and official of the see of Glasgow. Further promotion followed, but soon more important duties were entrusted to Elphinstone, who was made Bishop of Ross in 1481. He was a member of the Parliament of Scotland, and was sent by James III of Scotland on diplomatic missions to Louis XI of France and Edward IV of England. In 1483 he was appointed Bishop of Aberdeen, although his consecration was delayed for four years; and he was sent on missions to England, both before and after the death of Richard III of England in 1485.

Although he regularly attended the meetings of parliament he continued with his episcopal duties, and maintained the fabric of the cathedral. Early in 1488 he was made Lord High Chancellor, but on the king's death in the following June he left office, and retired to Aberdeen. As a diplomat, his services were quickly required by the new king, James IV of Scotland, in whose interests he visited the kings of England and France, and the German king, Maximilian I, Holy Roman Emperor.

Having been made Keeper of the Privy Seal of Scotland in 1492, and having arranged a dispute between the Scots and the Dutch, Elphinstone's later years were mainly spent in the foundation of the University of Aberdeen. The papal bull was obtained in 1494, and the royal charter which made Aberdeen the seat of a university is dated 1498. A small endowment was provided by the king. The university, modelled on that of Paris and intended principally as a law school, soon became the most famous and popular of the Scots seats of learning, largely due to the prestige of Elphinstone and his friend, Hector Boece, the first rector. The building of the college of the Holy Virgin in Nativity, now King's College, was completed in 1506. Elphinstone also built the central tower of St Machar's Cathedral, and funded the building of the first stone bridge over the River Dee. Continuing to participate in public affairs he opposed the policy of hostility towards England which led to the Battle of Flodden in September 1513. He died in Edinburgh.

Elphinstone was partly responsible for the introduction of printing into Scotland, and for the production of the Breviarium Aberdonense. He may have written some of the lives in this collection, and gathered together materials concerning the history of Scotland.

References

Sources
 Thomas, John. "The Elphinstone monument at King's College Aberdeen. Its construction in the sixteenth century and reconstruction (1909–31) by Henry Wilson", Aberdeen University Review, Vol. LIV, 4, No. 188 Autumn 1992, pp. 315–333.

Further reading
 Hector Boece, Murthiacensium et Aberdonensium episcoporum vitae, edited and translated by J. Moir (Aberdeen, 1894)
 Fasli Aberdonenses, edited by C. Innes (Aberdeen, 1854)
 Alexander Gardyne, Theatre of Scottish Worthies and Lyf of W. Elphinston, edited by David Laing (Aberdeen, 1878).

1431 births
1514 deaths
Bishops of Aberdeen
Bishops of Ross (Scotland)
People educated at the High School of Glasgow
Diplomats from Glasgow
Clergy from Glasgow
Lawyers from Glasgow
Members of the pre-1707 Parliament of Scotland
Scottish printers
Academics from Glasgow
People associated with the University of Aberdeen
Alumni of the University of Glasgow
Academic staff of the University of Orléans
University of Paris alumni
Academic staff of the University of Paris
15th-century Scottish Roman Catholic bishops
Founders of Scottish schools and colleges
Court of James IV of Scotland
16th-century Scottish Roman Catholic bishops
Kingdom of Scotland expatriates in France
15th-century Roman Catholic bishops in Scotland